Yibin Wuliangye Airport  is a dual-use public and military airport serving the city of Yibin in southern Sichuan province, China. Opened in December 2019, it replaced the older Yibin Caiba Airport. The airport is named after Wuliangye, a locally made liquor that is one of the most famous baijiu brands in China.

Overview
The airport received approval from the State Council of China in May 2012. Construction began in October 2016 with a total investment of 2.927 billion yuan, and the airport opened on 5 December 2019. It replaced the older Yibin Caiba Airport.

Facilities
It is projected to handle 2.5 million passengers annually by 2024.

Airlines and destinations

Naming
The airport is named after Wuliangye, a famous liquor made in Yibin. This choice of name caused controversy in China. The name has been a target of ridicule by the public and is considered illegal by some legal experts.  Although Renhuai Maotai Airport, another airport under construction in nearby Guizhou Province, is also named after the famous liquor brand Maotai, it has not attracted as much criticism as Maotai itself is named after a town.  Responding to the controversy, the Wuliangye Company has declared that it has not paid to have the airport named after its brand.

See also
List of airports in China
List of the busiest airports in China
Huawei station, metro station which also attracted attention for being named after a company

References

Airports in Sichuan
Airports established in 2019
Buildings and structures in Yibin
2019 establishments in China